Llamas are domesticated South American camelids.

Llamas may also refer to:

People
 Ale Llamas (born 1998), Spanish footballer
 Alejandra Llamas (born 1970), Mexican-American author
 Alfonso Cabello Llamas (born 1993), Spanish Paralympic cyclist
 Andrés Llamas (born 1998), Italian footballer
 Armando Llamas (1950-2003), Spanish playwright who worked with Philippe Adrien
 Brandon Thomas Llamas (born 1995), Spanish footballer
 César Llamas (born 1985), Paraguayan footballer
 Diego Osorio de Escobar y Llamas (1608-1673), Spanish Roman Catholic bishop
 Eva Llamas (born 1992), Spanish footballer
 Franco Llamas (born 1990), Argentine footballer
 Francisco Llamas, Spanish painter
 Guillermo Anaya Llamas (born 1968), Mexican politician
 Horacio Llamas (born 1973), Mexican basketball player
 José Ángel Llamas (born 1966), former Mexican telenovela actor
 José Antonio Llamas (born 1985), Spanish footballer
 Lorena Llamas (born 1967), Spanish former professional racing cyclist
 Luis Francisco García Llamas (born 1964), Mexican footballer
 Maluca Llamas (born 1962), Mexican tennis player
 María Eugenia Llamas (1944-2014), Mexican actress.
 Mario Llamas (1920-2014), Mexican tennis player
 Pedro González Llamas, Spanish general
 Sergio Llamas (born 1993), Spanish footballer
 Tom Llamas, journalist

Places
 Llamas, Asturias, a Spanish province
 Llamas de la Ribera, a Spanish city
 F. Llamas Street, in the Philippines

Other uses
 Sanchez-Llamas v. Oregon, 2006 American case
 "Llamas", a sketch from Monty Python's Flying Circus and Monty Python Live at Drury Lane

See also

 Llama (disambiguation)
 The High Llamas, British rock group